Enuamanu School or Apii Enuamanu is a co-educational school in Mapumai Village on the island of Atiu in the Cook Islands. It runs classes for early childhood education through to year 13, including levels 1–3 of the New Zealand National Certificate of Educational Achievement. 

The school was established in 1965 as Atiu Junior High School. It was renamed Atiu College in 1975 and then Enuamanu School in 1988.

In 2015 the school launched a radio station, Atiu 100FM.

References

Schools in the Cook Islands
Atiu
Educational institutions established in 1920
1920 establishments in the Cook Islands